Colleen Joy Miller (born November 10, 1932) is an American actress. She starred in several films, such as the Westerns Gunfight at Comanche Creek (1963) and Four Guns to the Border (1954).

Early life
The daughter of Elias and Lillian Miller, she was born in Yakima, Washington, and raised in Portland, Oregon. Miller attended Lincoln High School in Portland and graduated at age fifteen. In 1949, she was chosen "Miss Portland". Her mother named her after actress Colleen Moore.

As a child, Miller studied ballet, but when she was older she changed to popular dancing. After graduating, she worked as a professional dancer in a San Francisco ballet company, and relocated to Las Vegas after three seasons to work at the Flamingo.

Career
While dancing in Las Vegas, Miller was spotted by a talent agent who signed her to a contract with Howard Hughes for his RKO Pictures company. She was 19 when she made her first film appearance in The Las Vegas Story, starring Jane Russell.

She shared top billing with Rory Calhoun in her next film, a western titled Four Guns to the Border, which co-starred Nina Foch.  She then had a leading role in Playgirl as a young Midwestern girl who comes to New York City to be a model and ends up involved in a shooting and a scandal. She then was signed by Universal Pictures, where she co-starred with Tony Curtis in two films, The Purple Mask and The Rawhide Years.

Miller made one more film after 1958, a western titled Gunfight at Comanche Creek opposite Audie Murphy, before retiring from acting. However, she has an uncredited bit part in 1972's Stand Up and Be Counted.

Personal life
On January 20, 1955, Miller married camera manufacturer Ted Briskin. They remained wed until 1975. She married Walter Ralphs, an heir to the Ralphs supermarket chain, in 1976. She currently resides in California.

Filmography

References

Works cited

External links

 

1932 births
Living people
American film actresses
American television actresses
20th-century American actresses
People from Yakima, Washington
Actresses from Portland, Oregon
Actresses from Washington (state)
Lincoln High School (Portland, Oregon) alumni
RKO Pictures contract players
Western (genre) film actresses
21st-century American women